ITV Day was a programming block that broadcast on ITV1 from 9.25 am until 6.00 pm on weekdays and launched on 11 April 2005. The presentation was created by Bruce Dunlop Associates and said "ITV Day effectively creates a new brand,  a change in programming and schedule will alter viewer perception".

The "ITV Day" brand disappeared from screens on 13 January 2006, as ITV1 presentation was relaunched, along with the entire ITV family of channels.

Branding
The package was based around a logo and colour scheme that delineated the ITV Day branding from the rest of ITV1. The scheme of yellow, orange and red represented the colour of and warmth of the sun. The ITV logo remained blue as a link to the rest of the ITV family of logos (except ITV2's which was yellow at the time).

The package was produced using an innovative combination of live action and animation. The people featured in the idents were shot in the blue screen studio, while the backgrounds and some foreground elements were created in 3D.

Versions
UTV also used the same presentation during the day, albeit replacing the "ITV" logo with their own.

Scottish TV and Grampian TV (both owned by SMG plc) decided not to use the presentation package - and continued to use their normal idents and promotions during the day.

Programmes

A Brush with Fame
Baby House
Boot Sale Treasure Hunt
Cash Cab
Chef Vs Britain
Date My Daughter
Dial a Mum
Everything Must Go
Have I Been Here Before?
ITV Lunchtime News
The Jeremy Kyle Show
Kojak
Loose Women
Mum's on Strike
Nanny 911
Nigella
Now or Never
The Paul O'Grady Show
The People's Court
Perseverance
Solution Street
The Springer Show
This Morning
Today with Des and Mel
Too Many Cooks
Trading Treasures
Trisha
Watching the Detectives

ITV (TV network)